Richard Debrunner (born 3 November 1937) is a Swiss former wrestler. He competed in the men's Greco-Roman bantamweight at the 1960 Summer Olympics.

References

External links
 

1937 births
Living people
Swiss male sport wrestlers
Olympic wrestlers of Switzerland
Wrestlers at the 1960 Summer Olympics
Sportspeople from Thurgau